Hüffenhardt is a town in the district of Neckar-Odenwald-Kreis, in Baden-Württemberg, Germany.

Administration
The municipality consists of two subdivisions:

 Hüffenhardt, population 1536 (2008)
 Kälbertshausen, population 533 (2008)

References
 Official Web site

Neckar-Odenwald-Kreis